Uncial 0256 (in the Gregory-Aland numbering) is a Greek uncial manuscript of the New Testament. Paleographically it has been assigned to the 8th century.

Description 

The codex contains two small parts of the Gospel of John 6:32-33,35-37, on one parchment leaf (4 cm by 4 cm). The text is written in one column per page, 4 or 6 lines per page, in uncial letters. It contains a commentary.

The nomina sacra are written in an abbreviated way.

Text 
The Greek text of this codex is mixed. Aland placed it in Category III. 

It is dated by the INTF to the 8th century.

Location 
The codex is housed at the Austrian National Library (Pap. G. 26084) in Vienna. 
Karl Wessely believed the manuscript came from Fayyum.

See also 
 List of New Testament uncials
 Textual criticism

References

Further reading 
 
 U. B. Schmid, D. C. Parker, W. J. Elliott, The Gospel according to St. John: The majuscules (Brill 2007), pp. 143-144. [text of the codex]

Greek New Testament uncials
8th-century biblical manuscripts
Biblical manuscripts of the Austrian National Library